Pollywood may refer to:

 Punjabi cinema, the Punjabi language film industry in the Indian state of the Punjab

See also
 Pallywood, supposed media manipulation, distortion or fraud by the Palestinians and other Arabs in the context of the Israeli–Palestinian conflict